Seattle, Washington is home to many community centers. During the day some of these centers have child services such as day camp, after-school camp, and swimming activities. They include:

North Seattle
Ballard Community Center, 6020 28th Avenue NW, (206) 684-4093
Green lake Community Center, 7201 E Green Lake Drive N, (206)684-0780
Laurelhurst Community Center, 4554 NE 41st Street, (206) 684-7529
Loyal Heights Community Center, 2101 NW 77th Street, (206) 684-4052

South Seattle
Rainier Community Center, 4600 38th Avenue S, (206) 386-1919
Rainier Beach Community Center, 8825 Rainier Avenue S, (206) 386-1925
Van Asselt Community Center, 2820 S Myrtle Street, (206) 386-1921
Jefferson Community Center, 3801 Beacon Avenue S, (206) 684-7481

See also
Seattle.gov's Community Center page

Government of Seattle